Deepak Parambol (born November 1, 1988) is an Indian actor who appears in Malayalam films.

Deepak Parambol made his acting debut in Malarvaadi Arts Club (2010), directed by Vineeth Sreenivasan. He is notable for his roles in Thattathin Marayathu (2012), Thira (2013), D Company (2013),  Kunjiramayanam (2015), Ore Mukham (2016), The Great Father (2017), Ottamuri Velicham (2017),  Rakshadhikari Baiju Oppu (2017), Vishwa Vikhyatharaya Payyanmar (2017), Captain (2018), B tech (2018), Ormayil Oru Shishiram (2019) and An International Local Story (2019). 
He has also received acclaims for his performance in the award-winning short film 'Chithrakadha'.

Career
Deepak made his debut in Vineeth Sreenivasan's Malarvady Arts Club (2010), a role that he bagged after responding to an advertisement in a local newspaper. He has played minor, supporting and main roles in his career spanning a decade. In his lead role for Ormayil Oru Shishiram, he lost 10 kilograms to look like a school-going teenager for a part of the movie.

Filmography

References

External links 
 

Indian male film actors
Male actors in Malayalam cinema
21st-century Indian male actors
Living people
1988 births